Ambricourt is a commune in the Pas-de-Calais department in northern France.

The commune is the setting of Georges Bernanos's 1936 novel The Diary of a Country Priest (Journal d'un curé de campagne).

Geography
A small village situated some 15 miles (24 km) east of Montreuil-sur-Mer, on the D71 E4 road.

Population

See also
Communes of the Pas-de-Calais department

References

Communes of Pas-de-Calais
Artois